The Last Cannoli, published by Legas, is a novel by American author Camille Cusumano.  Inspired by Cusumano's experience as a descendant of Sicilian immigrants, the book is an intimate and at times sorrowful look at a family caught between the glories of the "old country" (Sicily), and the promise of prosperity in America.

Plot summary
The story is told through the eyes of different members of the Donatella family. Each of the Donitellas tells the family saga from the perspective of his or her age, gender and family position. Each perspective is unique but part of the whole, like the facets of a gem.

Characters
 Vincenzo Donatella - the head of the family
 Magdalena Donatella - Vincenzo's wife

References

External links
 The Last Cannoli on Amazon.com

1999 American novels
American historical novels
Novels set in the 20th century